Evaristo Iglesias Royero (26 October 1925 – 12 May 2005) was a Cuban sprinter. He competed in the men's 100 metres at the 1956 Summer Olympics.

References

External links
 

1925 births
2005 deaths
Athletes (track and field) at the 1956 Summer Olympics
Cuban male sprinters
Cuban male hurdlers
Olympic athletes of Cuba
Place of birth missing
Pan American Games medalists in athletics (track and field)
Pan American Games bronze medalists for Cuba
Athletes (track and field) at the 1955 Pan American Games
Athletes (track and field) at the 1959 Pan American Games
Medalists at the 1955 Pan American Games